Arthur Johnston may refer to:

Arthur Johnston (poet) (1579–1641), Scottish physician and poet
Arthur Johnston (fl. 1877), British bell maker with Gillett & Johnston
Arthur Johnston (cricketer) (1863–1929), English cricketer
Arthur Johnston (composer) (1898–1954), American composer and songwriter
Arthur Lawson Johnston, 3rd Baron Luke (1933–2015), British peer
Arthur Johnston (politician) (born 1947), Canadian politician, member of the Legislative Assembly of Alberta
Arthur Johnston (priest) (1866–1941), Irish Anglican priest
Lt col. Arthur Johnston (1776-1824), Command of the expedition of Candy and officer of the Royal Corsican Rangers

See also
Arthur Johnson (disambiguation)